Hamzeh Kola-ye Shesh Pol (also Romanized as Ḩamzeh Kolā-ye Shesh Pol; also known as Ḩamzeh Kalā and Ḩamzeh Kolā) is a village in Esbu Kola Rural District, in the Central District of Babol County, Mazandaran Province, Iran. At the 2006 census, its population was 1,180, in 328 families.

References 

Populated places in Babol County